The 1978 Philta International was a men's tennis tournament played an outdoor clay courts in Manila, Philippines. It was the sixth edition of the tournament and was held from 20 November through 26 November 1978. The tournament was part of the Grand Prix tennis circuit. Eighth-seeded Yannick Noah won the singles title and earned $12,750 first-prize money.

Finals

Singles
 Yannick Noah defeated  Peter Feigl 7–6, 6–0
 It was Noah's first singles title of his career.

Doubles
 Sherwood Stewart /  Brian Teacher defeated  Ross Case /  Chris Kachel 6–3, 7–6

References

External links
 ITF tournament edition details

Philippine Open
 Philippine Open
Philippine Open
Tennis in the Philippines